

Mating Habits 
Rainbow boa sexes have different ages at which they can/should mate. Females should be from 2.5 to 4.5 years old before breeding. Males should be a minimum of 2.5 years old. Females need to be the correct size otherwise they could have complications during and after birth. Males can mate with multiple female which can be beneficial for reptile breeding.

Eating Habits During Breeding Season 
Males generally go without feeding during the mating season and Females tend to eat smaller portions during the breeding season. In order to decrease the probability of birthing issues, Females should be fed smaller rats/mice in order to save space for proper ova development.

It is not unusual for both sexes to go without eating during the mating season.

The rainbow boa (Epicrates cenchria) is a boa species endemic to Central and South America. A semi-arboreal species (not only do they climb in they wild but also proven in captivity), it is known for its attractive iridescent/holographic sheen caused by structural coloration. Five subspecies are currently recognized, including the nominate subspecies described here.

Distribution and habitat
The rainbow boa is found in lower Central America (Costa Rica and Panama), and farther south into South America. It occurs east of the Andes, roughly reaching northern Argentina (in the provinces Chaco, Córdoba, Corrientes, Formosa, Salta, Santiago del Estero and Tucumán).

The rainbow boa's habitat generally consists of humid woodlands and rainforests, but it can also be found in open savannas.

Behavior 
Rainbow boas are nocturnal and most active in the middle of the night.

This species is semi-arboreal, spending time both on the ground and in trees. They are also known to spend time in bodies of water, and are considered capable swimmers.

Captivity
The most common type of rainbow boa found found in the pet trade is the Brazilian rainbow boa, E. c. cenchria. During the 1980s and early 1990s, substantial numbers were exported from Suriname. Today, however, far fewer are exported, and most offered for sale are captive bred. With good care, a captive Brazilian rainbow boa can be expected to live for up to 30 years.

Subspecies

Etymology
The subspecific names barbouri and gaigeae are in honor of American herpetologists Thomas Barbour and Helen Beulah Thompson Gaige, respectively.

Gallery

References

Further reading
Boulenger GA (1893). Catalogue of the Snakes in the British Museum (Natural History). Volume I., Containing the Families ... Boidæ ... London: Trustees of the British Museum (Natural History). xiii + 448 pp. + Plates I-XXVIII. (Epicrates cenchris, pp. 94-96).
Freiberg M (1982). Snakes of South America. Hong Kong: T.F.H. Publications. 189 pp. . (Epicrates cenchria, pp. 87-88, 125-127 + photographs on pp. 18-19, 22-23, 45).
Linnaeus C (1758). Systema naturæ per regna tria naturæ, secundum classes, ordines, genera, species, cum characteribus, dierentiis, synonymis, locis. Tomus I. Editio Decima, Reformata. Stockholm: L. Salvius. 824 pp. (Boa cenchria, new species, p. 215). (in Latin).

External links

https://reptilesmagazine.com/how-to-breed-beautiful-rainbow-boas/

Epicrates
Reptiles of South America
Reptiles described in 1758
Taxa named by Carl Linnaeus